WAUG-LD, virtual channel 8 and VHF digital channel 4, is a low-powered Independent television station licensed to Raleigh, North Carolina, United States. The station is owned by St. Augustine's University. On cable, the station can be seen on Spectrum digital tier channel 168 throughout much of the greater Raleigh service area.  Much of its programming is oriented towards the African-American community, which include gospel music, religious programming, and community affairs.

In addition students majoring in the Journalism and Mass Communications program at "St. Aug's" have the opportunity to work at the station in a laboratory setting to gain real-life experience while pursuing their degree.

St. Augustine's also owns radio station WAUG (750 AM), which broadcasts talk shows and sports programs.  For a period of time, the school housed (but didn't own) WRMY (channel 47), an independent television station formerly based in Rocky Mount that moved its transmitter to Franklin County to provide better coverage to the Raleigh-Durham-Fayetteville market.  WRMY was sold to Paxson Communications in 1998 and became WRPX, the area's Pax (now Ion) affiliate.

WAUG-LD signed on in 1988 as W68BK. It became WAUG-LP on April 9, 2012, though the station has long branded as "WAUG-TV". The call sign was changed to WAUG-LD, shortly after being licensed for digital operation.

References

External links

AUG-LD
Television channels and stations established in 1988
St. Augustine's University (North Carolina)
Low-power television stations in the United States